"The Moon Over Georgia" is a song written by Mark Narmore and recorded by American country music group Shenandoah. It was released in April 1991 as the fourth single from their album Extra Mile. The song reached number 9 on the Billboard Hot Country Singles & Tracks chart in July 1991. It was previously recorded by Larry Boone for his 1990 album, Down That River Road.

Chart performance

Year-end charts

References

1991 singles
1990 songs
Shenandoah (band) songs
Columbia Records singles
Songs about Georgia (U.S. state)